Dui Prithibi (English: Two Worlds) is a 2010 Bengali road movie directed by Raj Chakraborty and stars Jeet, Dev, Koel Mallick and  Barkha Bisht Sengupta in the lead roles. It was the highest grossing Bengali film of 2010. A remake of the Telugu film Gamyam, Dui Prithibi brought two of the biggest stars of Bengali cinema, Jeet and Dev, together for the only time on the celluloid.

Plot 
Rahul Roy, (Jeet) as called by his friends and family, is the son of a multi-millionaire called Abhiraj Roy. He is born and brought up in comfort and luxury and for him life is just a game and he is accustomed to lavish lifestyle. He is portrayed to be a happy go lucky character and quite popular with the female kind. He comes across Nandini (Koel Mallick), a young & charming doctor. Rahul challenges his friends that he would make her fall in love within few days. Rahul invites Nandini for coffee after a dance programme and proposes to her.

Nandini, being an orphan, is very kind towards the poor people and is a good Samaritan. She mingles with poor people and provides succor to them. But, being a rich boy, Rahul hates those people. However, Nandini's free-spirited nature takes him very near to her and he develops an intimate friendship. At the same time, Nandini keeps maintaining some distance and does not express her love. Though she likes him, she can't love him for his insensitivity towards the people and things around him. A privileged upbringing makes him myopic to the hard realities of life. By the time, she wants to express her love, she learns that Rahul has challenged his friends about his love and decides to keep herself off.

While dropping her at her hostel on his car after a party, Rahul tries to convince her that he is really in love with her but she does not listen to him. In the process, Rahul has an accident, where a woman dies and her son is orphaned. Nandini survives the accident, while Rahul wakes up from injuries in hospital. After gaining consciousness, Rahul cannot find Nandini and he decides to go in search of her on his bike.

In the process, he happens to meet a motorbike thief called Shibu (Dev). Though Shibu is a vehicle thief, he is good at heart. The journey Rahul takes changes his life drastically: as he is exposed to the hard realities of rural life and yet its simple joys. The landscapes and the people he meets takes him through an emotional journey that alters his perceptions forever. Be it a teacher (Manoj Mitra) who supports orphan kids, a disillusioned ex-militant (Debranjan Nag), a prostitute who craves for love (Barkha Bisht Sengupta), or his own companion Shibu, they all aid in his journey to self-discovery.

Cast
 Jeet as Rahul Roy
 Dev as Shibu, motorbike thief
 Koel Mallick as Nandini, Rahul's love interest
 Barkha Sengupta as Mandakini, Shibu's love interest and a dancer (cameo)
 Manoj Mitra as a school teacher
 Kharaj Mukherjee as Gopaler baba
 Supriyo Dutta as the Naxalite leader
 Raja Dutta as a Naxalite
 Dr. B D Mukherjee as Rahul's father

Production 
The film was the 42nd venture of the leading Bengali production house "Shree Venkatesh Films". It was the fifth film of director Raj Charaborty and the tentth film for Dev and the Jeet-Koel pair. It was Raj's first film with Jeet-Koel, fourth with "SVF" and the third with Dev after "Challenge" (2009) and "Le Chakka" (2010). It was also the first time that the two reigning Bengali superstars, Dev and Jeet had come together. For the first time a budget of 3.5 crore was commissioned for a Bengali film as this was the first road movie in the industry which was required to be shot on a large-scale and canvas. The 'muhurat shot' was canned on 2.3.10. The film was extensively shot in Kolkata and the rural belt of West Bengal like Lalgarh and Gopiballavpur (Maoist-infested areas), Purulia, Bantala, etc., and the songs were filmed in Venice. It was the first Bengali film to be shot in Italy and only the second mainstream Bengali film to be shot in Europe, after "Bhalobasa Bhalobasa" (2008) was shot in Austria. While the main film was shot by cinematographer Somak Mukherjee; Sirsha Ray came on board for the Venice-leg as Somak couldn't allot his dates. Bollywood item-girl Barkha Bisht, famous for her "Ishq Barse" dance-number from the film "Raajneeti", was roped in for a song called 'Pyarelal' and was selected to play one of the two female leads. The film's lead composer Jeet Gannguli was also supposed to do the background score of the film. But a leg-injury rendered him indisposed; resulting in another leading composer Indradeep Dasgupta performing the duties. The first-look of the film was launched on 17.9.10 with the song "O yaara ve", filmed on all the four leads that was aired on the leading Bengali entertainment channel "Sangeet Bangla".

The film was shot in India and Italy (Apulia), at Alberobello, Santa Cesarea Terme and Fasano.

Soundtrack 

The music is composed by Jeet Gannguli and Samidh-Rishi. The first 2 songs of the following are by Samidh-Rishi, while the rest are by Jeet Gannguli:

Critical response

Ratings and reviews 
Roshni Mukherjee, from The Times of India, gave it a rating of 4/5 stars. Yajneni Chakraborty, from "Hindustan Times" gave it 3.5/5 stars. Jagori Bannerjee, from the leading Bengali daily, Anandabazar Patrika, gave it 6.5/10. Swapan Mullick from The Statesman gave it 2.5 stars, but described it to be 'fulfilling expectations'. Sudipta Dey, from The Bengal Post, rated it as 'average' but mentioned the film 'has a strong social message' and 'Raj's expertise in weaving the story is undoubtedly good.'. Veteran film-critic, Shoma A. Chatterji gave the film 5/10 on the web-portal, "Upperstall.com"; but on "Calcuttatube", she increased it to 6/10. Aditya Chakrabarty, from another web-portal, "Washington Bangla Radio" highlighted that Dev had delivered his best performance till then and Jeet and Koel also lived up to the hype. Debabrata Chowdhury, from "Bartaman" opined people should like the film. The leading Bengali magazine, "Anandalok" believed the film created a new world  in Bengali commercial cinema. Mahua Duttamitra, from "Ekdin" certified that the director along with his full team had passed with distinction. Samrat Mukherjee, from "Aajkaal" wrote the director has mixed commerce with experimentation. Bidisha Chatterjee, from Sangbad Pratidin, considered the director had hit bull's-eye. "Sakalbela" depicted the film to be a must-watch. Another leading English daily, The Telegraph, also hailed the film's cinematography.

Release

Running period 
The film released in an unprecedented 209 theatres across West Bengal on a Thursday during 'Saptami' of the 'Durga Puja'. It ran for 5 weeks in the city, after which it had to make space for another big release Mon Je Kore Uru Uru; though according to "The Telegraph", the film managed to complete a 6-week run in the city. The film had its longest multiplex run of 4 weeks at 'Bioscope', Axis Mall in Rajarhat and 'Inox Burdwan'. "Dui Prithibi" completed an extraordinary run of 50 weeks at the distant rural theatres of 'Basanti' at Dantan and 'Haraparbati' at Jhatipahari. It is understood, that the producers, 'SVF' deliberately withdrew the film from the city for "MJKUU" since they share extremely friendly relations with their producers, 'Surinder Films'. They in turn returned the favour to 'SVF' by withdrawing "MJKUU" from city-halls within 5 weeks to make room for the next 'SVF' offering, "Sedin Dekha Hoyechilo". Without this friendly gesture from the producers, "Dui Prithibi" could have been expected to continue its successful city-run for a longer period of time.

Box office analysis 
"Dui Prithibi" was the highest grosser of 2010, according to a study conducted by FICCI & Deloitte. The film had the highest ever opening week collection for a Bengali film. It grossed almost Rs.29 million in its 1st week, while the producers raked in almost Rs.20 million. The film continued a steady run in the city till the 3rd week. The rural collections though witnessed a fall from the 2nd week itself. Ultimately, after the less-than-expected 5-week city-run, the producers earned an impressive Rs.50 million, as reported in the dailies 'Gulf Times', 'The Statesman' (23.12.11), 'Economic Times' (30.4.11); the web-portals 'Golden Reel' (28.1.11), 'The Indian Express' (19.12.11) and the annual report of Deloitte in 2011. In another isolated report in 'The Times of India' on 15.6.12, it was reported that the film was made on a budget of Rs.35 million and did 'tentative business' of Rs.40 million. Considering the budget (it was the most expensive Bengali film at that time) and the massive cast & crew of the film, nothing less than a 'blockbuster' was expected. The overall collections would have been good enough to merit a 'superhit' status for any other film, but the film's huge budget of Rs.35 million, proved a determining factor. "Dui Prithibi" fell short of delivering a 'superhit/blockbuster'; but the collections were good enough to adjudge the film a 'hit' and a considerable success.

Awards and nominations 
"Dui Prithibi" won three awards at the prestigious 'Star Jalsha Entertainment Awards 2011' held at the Science City Auditorium on 28.5.11. The results were calculated solely on the basis of audience votes sent through SMS and the channel's official website. The following is the list of awards won by the film :-

(1) 'Best Superhit Film'. The other nominations were : "Autograph", "Amanush", "Josh" and "Le Chakka".
(2) 'Best Superhit Music'. The other nominations were : "Autograph", "Amanush", "Moner Manush" and "Le Chakka".
(3) 'Best Superhit Heroine': Koel Mallick for "Dui Prithibi". The other confirmed nominations were : Srabanti Chatterjee for "Wanted", Payel Sarkar for "Le Chakka" and Priyanka Sarkar for "Jodi Ekdin".

Other than these, Jeet was also nominated from this film for 'Best Superhit Hero' which was eventually won by Prosenjit Chatterjee for "Autograph", Dev was nominated from this film for 'Best Supporting Actor' which was in the end won by Saswata Chatterjee for "Byomkesh Bakshi" and Jeet-Koel were nominated from this film for 'Best Pair Award' which was ultimately won by Dev-Payel for "Le Chakka".
Barkha Bisht Sengupta won the 'Best Newcomer Award' for this film in the "Anandalok Awards 2010".

World television premiere 
The satellite rights of "Dui Prithibi" were purchased by "Star Jalsha", a leading Bengali entertainment channel in West Bengal; in a combo-package of all ensuing films produced and distributed by its producers, "Shree Venkatesh Films Pvt. Ltd." The film had its world TV premiere on 13 February 2011 at 4:30 pm on "Star Jalsha".

References

External links
 

2010 films
Bengali-language Indian films
Bengali remakes of Telugu films
Indian drama road movies
2010s Bengali-language films
2010 romantic drama films
2010s drama road movies
Films shot in Italy
Films shot in Kolkata
Films shot in West Bengal
Indian buddy drama films
Indian romantic drama films
Films directed by Raj Chakraborty
2010s buddy drama films
Films scored by Rishi Chanda